Antillocorini is a tribe of dirt-colored seed bugs in the family Rhyparochromidae. There are more than 30 genera and 110 described species in Antillocorini.

Genera
These 35 genera belong to the tribe Antillocorini:

 Acolhua Distant, 1893
 Antillocoris Kirkaldy, 1904
 Antillodema Slater, 1980
 Arimacoris Baranowski & Slater, 1987
 Baeocoris Slater, 1983
 Bathydema Uhler, 1893
 Bocundostethus Scudder, 1962
 Botocudo Kirkaldy, 1904
 Branstettocoris Brailovsky, 2010
 Caeneusia Strand, 1928
 Caymanis Baranowski & Brambila, 2001
 Cligenes Distant, 1893
 Gemmacoris Baranowski & Slater, 1987
 Homoscelis Horvath, 1884
 Iodinus Lindberg, 1927
 Kinundastethus Scudder, 1962
 Lethaeaster Breddin, 1905
 Lethaeastroides Malipatil & Woodward, 1989
 Microcoris Bergroth, 1908
 Microlugenocoris Scudder, 1962
 Neopoliocoris Zhang & Chen, 2015
 Nympholethaeus Woodward, 1959
 Paradema Slater, 1980
 Paurocoris Slater, 1980
 Polycligenes Scudder, 1962
 Pulmomerus Cervantes & Brailovsky, 2012
 Schuhocoris Slater, 1985
 Scythinus Distant, 1893
 Siniasinensis Scudder, 1968
 Terenocoris Slater, 1980
 Tomocoris Woodward, 1953
 Tomocoroides Woodward, 1963
 Trachinocoris Slater, 1980
 Tropistethus Fieber, 1861
 Valeris Brambila, 2000

References

Further reading

External links

 

Rhyparochromidae
Articles created by Qbugbot